Falls Creek may refer to:

In Australia
 Falls Creek, New South Wales, a small town on the South Coast of New South Wales
 Falls Creek, Victoria, a ski resort in the Victorian Alps
 Falls Creek (Victoria), a watercourse with its headwaters in the Victorian Alps

In Canada
 Falls Creek, British Columbia, Canada: a waterfall and creek in Wells Gray Provincial Park

In the United States
 Falls Creek (California)
 Falls Creek (Deep River tributary), a stream in Moore and Chatham Counties, North Carolina
 Falls Creek, Pennsylvania, a town 
 Falls Creek Baptist Conference Center, Oklahoma

See also 
 Falls River (disambiguation)
 False Creek